The 2012 The Oaks Club Challenger is a professional tennis tournament played on clay courts. It is the fourth edition of the tournament which is part of the 2012 ITF Women's Circuit. It took place in Osprey, Florida, United States between 26 March and 1 April 2012. It offered the prize of US$ 50,000.

WTA entrants

Seeds

 1 Rankings are as of March 19, 2012.

Other entrants
The following players received wildcards into the singles main draw:
  Madison Brengle
  Caroline Dailey
  Melanie Oudin
  Jessica Pegula

The following players received entry from the qualifying draw:
  Jana Čepelová
  Grace Min
  Florencia Molinero
  Coco Vandeweghe

The following players received entry by a lucky loser spot:
  Kristina Mladenovic

Champions

Singles

 Arantxa Rus def.  Sesil Karatantcheva, 6–4, 6–1

Doubles

 Lindsay Lee-Waters /  Megan Moulton-Levy def.  Alexandra Panova /  Lesia Tsurenko, 2–6, 6–4, [10–7]

References
 ITF Site
 Official website

The Oaks Club Challenger
Clay court tennis tournaments